Lu Guangzu (born on 19 October 1996) is a Chinese badminton player. In 2018, Lu made into his first final at the Lingshui China Masters. Since then, he both won Australian Open and Canada Open's titles.

Career

2022 
Lu reached the final of the Australian Open, his first final in four years, defeating world No.2 Lee Zii Jia en route. Although he lost to compatriot Shi Yuqi in three games, he qualified for the World Tour Finals for the first time in his career. In his group, he defeated Prannoy H. S. in a tight three-game match, but failed to qualify for the semi-finals as he lost to world No.1 Viktor Axelsen and Kodai Naraoka, both in straight games.

Achievements

BWF World Tour (2 titles, 3 runners-up) 
The BWF World Tour, which was announced on 19 March 2017 and implemented in 2018, is a series of elite badminton tournaments sanctioned by the Badminton World Federation (BWF). The BWF World Tour is divided into levels of World Tour Finals, Super 1000, Super 750, Super 500, Super 300, and the BWF Tour Super 100.

Men's singles

References

External links 
 
 

Living people
1996 births
Sportspeople from Xuzhou
Badminton players from Jiangsu
Chinese male badminton players
21st-century Chinese people